Zaccharie Risacher (born April 8, 2005) is a French professional basketball player for ASVEL of the French LNB Pro A and the EuroLeague.

Early life
Risacher was born in Málaga, Spain, where his father was playing professional basketball for Baloncesto Málaga.

Professional career
Risacher entered the youth program for ASVEL Basket in 2020. He primarily played for the team's club in LNB Espoirs, the French under-21 league.

Risacher made his debut with the senior team in 2021 against Boulogne-Levallois. He also made his EuroLeague debut later in the season. Risacher also averaged 12.5 points and 4.4 rebounds in LNB Espoirs competition.

National team career
Risacher played for the France under-17 basketball team at the 2022 FIBA Under-17 Basketball World Cup. He averaged 10.4 points and 4.4 rebounds as France won the bronze medal.

Personal life
Risacher's father, Stéphane Risacher, played basketball professionally and won a silver medal at the 2000 Summer Olympics with the France national basketball team.

References

External links
RealGM profile

2005 births
Living people
French men's basketball players
Small forwards
ASVEL Basket players